Sodium tartrate (Na2C4H4O6) is a salt used as an emulsifier and a binding agent in food products such as jellies, margarine, and sausage casings.  As a food additive, it is known by the E number E335.

Because its crystal structure captures a very precise amount of water, it is also a common primary standard for Karl Fischer titration, a common technique to assay water content.

See also
 Monosodium tartrate

References

External links
Properties of Sodium Tartrate at linanwindow
Properties of Sodium Tartrate at JTBaker

Tartrates
Organic sodium salts
Food additives
E-number additives